is a mountain in Chichibu, Saitama, Japan.

Mountains of Saitama Prefecture
Chichibu, Saitama